Syed Abdul Rasheed is a Pakistani politician who has been a member of the Provincial Assembly of Sindh since August 2018.

Political career

He was elected to the Provincial Assembly of Sindh as a candidate of Jamaat-e-Islami from Constituency PS-108 (Karachi South-II) in 2018 Pakistani general election.In Feb 2022, the lawmaker had locked himself up with the Karachi Sewerage Board Official responsible for his area's sewerage, as a protest to resolve sewerage problems of his area. After several hours of protest, he later left on the solemn promise of KWSB MD to resolve the issues of sewerage in Liyari.

On 29 July 2022, he was arrested for protesting peacefully against the dilapidated sewerage system in his constituency of Liyari. The sewerage board in Liyari was then under management of provincial government of Pakistan People's Party.

References

Living people
Year of birth missing (living people)